UAE Cup is a men's one-day cycle race which takes place in the United Arab Emirates and was rated by the UCI as 1.2 and forms part of the UCI Asia Tour.

Winners

References

UCI Asia Tour races
Cycle races in the United Arab Emirates
2015 establishments in the United Arab Emirates
Recurring sporting events established in 2015
Winter events in the United Arab Emirates